The Honor of Thieves is a 1909 American silent short drama film directed by D. W. Griffith.

Cast
 Florence Lawrence as Rachel Einstein
 Harry Solter as Mr. Einstein
 George Gebhardt as Musician
 Anita Hendrie as At Dance
 Arthur V. Johnson as Customer / Musician
 Wilfred Lucas
 David Miles as At Dance
 Owen Moore as Ned Grattan
 Frank Powell
 Mack Sennett as At Dance / Policeman

References

External links
 

1909 films
1909 drama films
Silent American drama films
American silent short films
American black-and-white films
Films directed by D. W. Griffith
1909 short films
1900s American films